Brinchmann is a surname. Notable people with the surname include:

Alex Brinchmann (1888–1978), Norwegian pediatrician, songwriter, novelist, playwright and crime fiction writer
Arild Brinchmann (1922–1986), Norwegian stage producer, film producer and theatre director
Christopher Brinchmann (1864–1940), Norwegian archivist, literary historian and critic